Robert Wallace Russell (January 19, 1912 – February 11, 1992) was an American writer for movies, plays, and documentaries. He was nominated for two Academy Awards for Best Writing, Original Story and Best Writing, Screenplay on the 1943 film The More the Merrier.

He died in 1992 in New York City, shortly after his 80th birthday.

Filmography 
 Ring of Steel (1942) short U.S. Army film directed by Garson Kanin; narration read by Spencer Tracy
 The More the Merrier (1943) (screenplay)
 The Well-Groomed Bride (1946) (screenplay)
 The Lady Says No (1952)
 Come September (1961)
 Walk Don't Run (1966) (story)

Plays
 Take Me Along (1959)
 Flora the Red Menace (1965)
 Queen Lear
 Washington Shall Hang

References

External links 

American male screenwriters
1912 births
1992 deaths
University of Southern California alumni
20th-century American male writers
20th-century American screenwriters